Tywappity Township may refer to the following townships in the U.S. state of Missouri:

 Tywappity Township, Mississippi County, Missouri
 Tywappity Township, Scott County, Missouri

Township name disambiguation pages